is a passenger railway station located in the southern part of Miyamae-ku, Kawasaki, Kanagawa Prefecture, Japan, operated by the private railway company Tokyu Corporation.

Lines

Station layout
The station  consists of two opposed elevated side platforms serving two tracks. The platforms are connected to the station building by underpasses.

Platforms

History 
Miyamaedaira Station was opened on April 1, 1966.

Passenger statistics
In fiscal 2019, the station was used by an average of 37,275 passengers daily. 

The passenger figures for previous years are as shown below.

Surrounding area
Kawasaki City Miyamae Ward Office
Kawasaki City Miyamae Cultural Center
Kawasaki City Miyamae Library
Miyamaedaira Children's Cultural Center

See also
 List of railway stations in Japan

References

External links

 

Railway stations in Kanagawa Prefecture
Tokyu Den-en-toshi Line
Railway stations in Kawasaki, Kanagawa